Judge Shepherd may refer to:

Bobby Shepherd (born 1951), judge of the United States Court of Appeals for the Eighth Circuit
Samuel Shepherd (1760–1840), Lord Chief Baron of the Scottish Court of Exchequer

See also
Judge Sheppard (disambiguation)
Justice Shepard (disambiguation)